Riverbank State Park is a  state park built on top of a sewage treatment facility on the Hudson River, in the New York City borough of Manhattan. It was opened in 1993. On September 5, 2017, it was renamed Denny Farrell Riverbank State Park, after longtime  New York State Assembly member Denny Farrell who represented the surrounding area.

Park facilities

Riverbank State Park was designed by Dattner Architects and Abel Bainnson Butz Landscape Architects and opened May 27, 1993. The original idea for a park atop the sewage plant was Philip Johnson's, who proposed a series of decorative fountains and a reflecting pool.

Community opposition forced further proposals for a park design that was useful to the surrounding community.  Gruzen Architects made a design proposal in 1969, and Bond Ryder/Lawrence Halprin made another proposal in 1973-1975.  Some iterations of the design included fully decking over the West Side Highway to create a continuous park.  All of these designs were unfeasible, however, due to cost.  Dattner Architects was formally selected in 1980 for the project, after a series of community engagements 1978-1980. leading to a design phase 1980-1988.  Some aspects of the plan had to be simplified due to a 13% budget cut in 1989. The design was inspired by Japanese rooftop facilities, where a similar concept was used for Ochiai Water Reclamation Center and Ochiai Chuo Park.

The river continues to flow under the structure. A key design consideration for the park was reducing loads to the structure below, so lightweight construction techniques were used wherever possible.

The park was built over the North River Wastewater Treatment Plant, which processes  of wastewater every day during dry weather, and is designed to handle up to  a day when the weather is wet. In order to minimize odors emitted by the plant, dedicated odor-control facilities have been installed at the plant, including $55 million in recent upgrades. The plant sits on 2,300 caissons pinned into bedrock up to  beneath the river. Construction of the foundation was completed in 1978, and the wastewater treatment facilities were constructed in two phases between 1986 and 1991.

One of only three state parks within Manhattan (the others being Hudson River Park and Franklin D. Roosevelt Four Freedoms Park), it has become one of the most heavily used state parks in New York. This is the largest green roof in New York City.

The park includes an Olympic-size swimming pool (home to the Riverbank Redtails swim team),, a covered skating rink for roller skating in the summer and ice-skating in the winter, an 800-seat cultural theater, a 2,500-seat athletic complex with fitness room, a 400m track, a 150-seat restaurant, community gardens, and a horticultural learning lab.  Bicycling is strictly forbidden in the park but the Hudson River Greenway passes at water level.

A popular attraction is the Totally Kid Carousel created by Maria Reidelbach and Milo Mottola, featuring animals designed from neighborhood children's drawings. Children whose drawings were selected received a $50 savings bond as well as free rides for life.

See also 
 List of New York state parks
 Paterson, David "Black, Blind, & In Charge: A Story of Visionary Leadership and Overcoming Adversity."Skyhorse Publishing. New York, New York, 2020

References

External links 

 New York State Parks: Riverbank State Park
 North River Treatment Plant page

State parks of New York (state)
Parks in Manhattan
Hamilton Heights, Manhattan
Manhattan Waterfront Greenway
1993 establishments in New York City
Protected areas established in 1993